Fati Jamali (born 14 November 1988) is a Moroccan actress, singer and a television presenter best known as Miss Arab Beauty 2014.

References

Living people
Moroccan beauty pageant winners
Moroccan female models
1988 births